The following is an overview of the events of 1906 in motorsport, including the major racing events, racing festivals, circuits that were opened and closed during a year, championships and non-championship events that were established and disestablished in a year, and births and deaths of racing drivers and other motorsport people.

Annual events
The calendar includes only annual major non-championship events or annual events that had own significance separate from the championship. For the dates of the championship events see related season articles.

Opened motorsport venues
 29 January - opening of Aspendale Racecourse (Aspendale Speedway) near Melbourne (1906) was the world's first purpose-built motor racing circuit.

Births

References

External links
Aspendale Speedway 1906 http://www.hyperracer.com/history

 
Motorsport by year